Amadu Sulley is a Ghanaian public servant who is a former Deputy Chairperson of Electoral Commission of Ghana.

Career
He was appointed as deputy chairperson of the Ghanaian Electoral Commission in 2012 by then president, John Evans Atta-Mills. He had previously served as the Director of Research Monitoring and Evaluation at the same Commission until his promotion to the rank as Deputy chairperson. Sulley's appointment to the rank of a deputy chairperson was the first time a career electoral personnel had been appointed to that high rank. He served as the deputy chairperson in charge of operations at the Electoral Commission of Ghana until his dismissal in June 2018 for allegedly illegally transferring votes during the 2016 Ghanaian general election.

References

Living people
Election people
Alumni of the Accra Academy
Year of birth missing (living people)